Fritz Schneider was a Swiss footballer who played for FC Basel as a striker.

Football career
Schneider joined Basel in 1922. Between the years 1922 and 1924 Schneider (I), as he was known, played a total of 29 games for Basel scoring a total of eight goals. 13 of these games were in the Swiss Serie A and 16 were friendly games. He scored one goal in the domestic league and the other seven were scored during the test games.

Schneider (I) played his domestic league debut on 1 October 1922 in the at the Landhof in the home draw against Nordstern Basel. He scored his domestic league goal during the 4–3 home win against Aarau on 4 March 1923.

References

Sources
 Rotblau: Jahrbuch Saison 2017/2018. Publisher: FC Basel Marketing AG. 
 Die ersten 125 Jahre. Publisher: Josef Zindel im Friedrich Reinhardt Verlag, Basel. 
 Verein "Basler Fussballarchiv" Homepage

FC Basel players
Swiss men's footballers
Association football forwards